Lake Žovnek is a lake near Celje in Slovenia.

Zovnek
Geography of Celje
Savinja basin
Wetlands of Slovenia